Tony Terrell Hollings (born December 1, 1981) is a former American football running back. He was originally selected in the second round of the 2003 NFL Supplemental Draft out of Georgia Tech by the Houston Texans. He played in the German Football League for three seasons.

NFL
2003-2007 Because of a knee surgery when he was at Georgia Tech, Hollings went nearly a year between games, but he regained durability throughout his 2003 rookie season with the Houston Texans and showed promise. On September 21 against the Kansas City Chiefs, in his first non-special teams action, he rushed for 41 yards on 7 carries. He spent 2003-2005 with the Texans. He made his only career start in a game late in the 2003 season. Ex-coach Dom Capers said Hollings gave the team “some speed and burst.” He played 2007 season with the New York Jets. Hollings was given the nickname "Superman" during his college career because of the way he "flew" over defensive opponents.

Germany
In 2008, he played for the Dresden Monarchs in the German Football League as starting Halfback. One year later he was traded to the Berlin Adler but suffered a season-ending injury.

External links
Georgia Tech Yellow Jackets bio

Living people
1981 births
American football running backs
Sportspeople from Macon, Georgia
Georgia Tech Yellow Jackets football players
Houston Texans players
New York Jets players
Hamburg Sea Devils players
German Football League players
American expatriate sportspeople in Germany
American expatriate players of American football